The N-Gage service (also referred to as N-Gage 2.0) was a mobile gaming platform from Nokia that was available for several Nokia smartphones running on S60 (Symbian). N-Gage combined numerous games with 3D graphics into an application featuring online (via N-Gage Arena) and social features. The service was a successor to the original 2003 N-Gage gaming device.

The N-Gage platform was compatible with: Nokia N78, N79, N81, N81 8GB, N82, N85, N86, N86 8MP, N95, N95 8GB, N96, N97, Nokia 5320 XpressMusic, 5630 XpressMusic, 5730 XpressMusic Nokia 6210 Navigator, 6710 Navigator, 6720 Classic, E52, E55 and E75. Due to memory issues, hinted at during an interview in February 2008, support for the  Nokia N73, N93 and N93i was cancelled.

On October 30, 2009, Nokia announced that no new N-Gage games would be produced. Some reasons cited for its failure are its bad development model, marketing, and success of Apple's App Store.
 A total of 49 games were released for it. Nokia moved its games onto their Ovi Store thereafter. Games can still be played on compatible devices, but support for the service and its online features ceased in September 2010.

Background
Nokia's N-Gage gaming smartphone from 2003 did not perform as well as expected, and its upgraded QD version did not have significants improvements to its performance. Instead of developing a new gaming device, there was a change in concept as Nokia explained to the world during E3 2005 that they were planning to put a N-Gage platform on several smartphone devices, rather than releasing a specific device (although their N81 and 5730 XpressMusic models with its two dedicated gaming-buttons next to the screen is being marketed as a phone built for gaming). It was often nicknamed as N-Gage Next Generation by the public.

Working behind closed doors, it took a little more than a year before, at E3 2006, finally announcing the N-Gage mobile gaming service, set for a 2007 release. They also started showing off next-gen titles such as System Rush: Evolution and Hooked On: Creatures of the Deep, with the fighting game ONE perhaps being the most visually impressive—even making use of motion capture.

In February 2007, Nokia announced a pilot service in Finland to promote the upcoming service. Nokia showed off previews of the service at the 2007 Game Developers Conference in San Francisco, California.

On 27 August 2007, Nokia confirmed a previously leaked N-Gage logo is the official logo for the upcoming service.

Launch
The N-Gage gaming service in its final form was finally announced by Nokia on 29 August 2007. Nokia used the tagline Get out and play to promote the platform. It was supposed to be released in December 2007, but it was delayed as Nokia's team were making sure the service ran 'smoothly'.

First Access
A public beta test of the N-Gage application took place from 4 February 2008 to 27 March 2008, though limited only for the N81. This period of time was referred to as "First Access" and was only a public test of the client which could be downloaded for free from the N-Gage website. While not the final version, the user had access to most of the features that the new application had to offer along with three games to try out: Hooked On: Creatures of the Deep, System Rush: Evolution and Space Impact Kappa Base. Later in February, Nokia also released Tetris, Block Breaker Deluxe and World Series of Poker: Pro Challenge for test users. None of the games are entirely free, but all offer a limited trial for testing purposes. In order to experience the full game it has to be either purchased or rented.

Shortly after being released to the public, hackers managed to unpack the N-Gage installation file into components, which can then be installed separately, thus removing the N81-only limitation. N-Gage was subsequently reported working on other Nokia Nseries devices, such as N73 and N95. In response, Nokia released an advisory asking users not to install this unsupported version as it could cause errors or other issues.

On 20 March, the official N-Gage Blog reported that First Access would come to an end on 27 March, though all downloaded games at that time would still be playable through the application until the updated version was released—which occurred on 3 April.

Release
After numerous delays and many vague release dates, the N-Gage platform was finally (and also quite suddenly) released to the public on 3 April 2008 through the N-Gage official website, though only five phone models were initially compatible. This probably has to do with the older models being less powerful, as was pointed out in an interview earlier the same year where an N-Gage representative mentioned some memory issues with the N73. The launch titles also changed from six to only five: Asphalt 3: Street Rules, Brain Challenge, Hooked On: Creatures of the Deep, System Rush: Evolution, and World Series of Poker: Pro Challenge. The first two titles weren't even included on the original list (which included Block Breaker Deluxe and Tetris instead). The sixth (postponed) game was Space Impact Kappa Base.

After release
Some hours after the launch, the man behind the official N-Gage Blog, Ikona, had this to say about the delay: "We are currently ensuring Block Breaker Deluxe, Space Impact Kappa Base, and Tetris are running smoothly with our new application. These should be available in the showroom next week or two."

Four days later, on April 7 - Nokia posted their official press release commenting on the release of their new mobile service, and at which point FIFA 08 also became available for purchase.

With this release, the official website also saw a small change in appearance with price tags added to all games available for download, an event calendar, a tab for support on both the application itself and N-Gage compatible devices, and much more. Players logged into the website could now also see their Reputation level, N-Gage level, and gathered N-Gage points.

There was also a release party held at the N-Gage chat room shortly after the release, with several members from the N-Gage team attending to answer any questions. A few T-shirts were randomly handed out during the three-hour-long event and everyone was also promised a few N-Gage points for coming to the "party".

As expected, the launch was not problem-free as numerous people reported having trouble installing the application and logging into the N-Gage Arena. Others also had issues when it came to purchasing, activating, and downloading certain games.

Compatibility
Because N-Gage is a software based solution, the first generation MMC games are not compatible with the new platform, though some games made a comeback in the form of a sequel (e.g. System Rush: Evolution) or a remake/port (e.g. Mile High Pinball). Similarly, games developed for this next-gen N-Gage platform do not work on the original N-Gage nor N-Gage QD, adding to the fact that newer S60 software, including the N-Gage client and games, aren't binary-compatible with older S60 devices and vice versa.

The N-Gage application
With a user interface that resembles Microsoft’s Xbox Live service, at the top of the N-Gage launcher there are five icons that can be navigated through by pressing left and right on the phone’s thumb pad. These represent the user's games library, profile, friends list, and the showroom.

Home
The launcher welcomes the user with a Home screen where the last game played is shown along with quick links to their friends list, user progress (score table), a weekly game featured by Nokia for the week, and an Inbox for messaging within the launcher.

My Games
This screen shows all the games that are currently installed on the phone—be it a trial version or the full game (purchased or rented). Full games have a meter to the far right of their icon which illustrates a user's progression within that game. Trial games have a pink stripe that says "TRIAL" in place of the progression meter. At the bottom of the list of installed games is a quick link (Get More Games) which redirects the user to the showroom.

Games that are not paid for will show a pop-up every time they are played—asking the user whether they would like to try the free trial or either purchase, enter an unlock code (purchased or given through promotions), or rent the game. More on this below.

From this screen, the user may also rate any of the games downloaded from 1 to 5 stars, as well as write a small review.

My Profile
The next tab displays the user's profile, showing how many N-Gage points they've scored, their reputation level (ranging between 1-5 stars), the number of friends they have, and their avatar/picture (will display a white silhouette of a person with an orange background by default). Further down is the user's current status (offline, online or away—the last two can each be assigned with a personal message), N-Gage Point Level, and a list of the games they have played. Selecting one will not only display how many points the user has gathered within the chosen game—but will also show their friends' points for that same game. From here, users are also able to look at what achievements have been unlocked—or Point Pickups as they’re called.

My Friends
This is where users go to add friends and view their friends list. Once a friend is selected, they may choose to view recent conversations with the player, send them a message, view his or her profile, and rate the player. Messages can be sent regardless of whether the player is currently online or not. The friends list can be sorted by name, availability/status, or N-Gage points gathered.

Showroom
The Showroom displays all games that are available for download as well as Game Extras for expanding a game with extra content, such as downloading new episodes/adventures for the adventure game Dirk Dagger. Games may be browsed by genre, latest arrivals, or just in alphabetical order.

Payment can be made by either using a credit card or paying through the phone bill (network operator). Apart from actually purchasing a game, there’s also an option of renting.

Games can be downloaded directly to the phone over the air (by GPRS or WiFi), or the user may choose to download it to a computer and then install it on to the phone using a USB-cable and Nokia PC Suite.

Reception
There have been a lot of hands-on articles with the First Access client and they all generally reflect both the positive and negative feedback of the official First Access forum, where N81 users shared their thoughts on what was good and what could've been made better—regarding both the launcher itself and the games currently available. The biggest issues at that point was that of players not being able to "activate" a purchased game but still having only the trial version to play. A lot of players have also been reporting connection issues.

Head of New Experience, Nokia Play, Jaakko Kaidesoja had this to say to Pocket Gamer in an interview on 21 February 2008 when asked about what early feedback they had received:

"The feedback has been positive and well received within the company and some critical comments were well received as well. We know it's not perfect yet and there are some features people want more of. Those are the things we want to check and get on the roadmap."

Awards
Several of the N-Gage 2.0 games were nominated for International Mobile Gaming Awards in 2007.
Two out of three N-Gage 2.0 titles received an award:

 ONE by Digital Legends won the Best 3D award.
 Dirk Dagger and the Fallen Idol by Jadestone won the Best Gameplay award.
 Hooked On: Creatures of the Deep by Infinite Dreams Inc. was nominated for Best Gameplay, but did not receive the award.

On 8 May 2008, Hooked On: Creatures of the Deep won a Games Award during the 2008 Meffy Awards in Cannes.
Virtual Digital Showroom,

Technical details

Specifications

In order for the N-Gage platform and games to run smoothly, all N-Gage compatible mobile devices share a common set of specifications.

Screen: landscape or portrait 320 x 240 pixels (except N97, with a 640 x 360 pixels screen, graphics are stretched and displayed in a letterbox format to keep aspect ratio)

OS: Symbian S60 3rd edition (S60 5th edition on N97)

Interface: 5 way (up, down, left, right, center) directional pad, Dedicated action buttons Circle and Square (Mapped onto keypad '5' and '0' in portrait mode) and 2 contextual buttons. Touch screen interactions were not supported (N97 emulated the actions buttons into the on-screen buttons)

Connectivity: 3G or Wifi (Required for the connecting to the N-Gage platform for downloading games, online functions such as rankings and multiplayer)

CPU: ARM11 with speed ranges from 369 MHz (N81) to 600 MHz (E52)

GPU: 3D Graphics Hardware Accelerator supported (games running on devices such as the HW-Accelerated N95 have enhanced performance)

Audio: Stereo channel

Game Development

N-Gage games are packaged differently than normal Symbian applications and have the extension ".n-gage" and can only run via the N-Gage application. The game resources are protected by DRM.
They cannot use any native Symbian APIs, instead they use a proprietary API from the N-Gage SDK.

The N-Gage API is in fact an extension of the RGA API available in the Open C++ plug-in.

Only select companies are allowed access to the N-Gage SDK. To gain access they first must be approved by Nokia and sign a NDA.

Games library

As of 23 October 2009, there were 49 games released officially on N-Gage. Many other games were cancelled with the shutting down of the N-Gage service (see below).

Some of these games are sequels, remakes or ports of the first generation N-Gage MMC games.

Other games that were reportedly in development but are cancelled include:

Blades & Magic 
Creebies 
Galaxy on Fire 
Rally Master Pro 
Snowboard Hero 
The Dark Knight (based on the film of the same name) 
Midnight Poker 
Speed Racer (based on the film of the same name) 
Super Mah Jong 
Super Slam Ping Pong! 
World Rally Championship (FIA WRC official licence) 
Yamake

Closure of N-Gage
On 30 October 2009, Nokia announced that no new N-Gage games would be produced, effectively shutting down the N-Gage platform. All N-Gage services, which includes purchasing of games and various online features, had reportedly ceased operation by the end of 2010.

On 31 March 2011 Nokia closed their DRM activation service, leaving customers unable to reactivate their purchases in the case of a device format or software update. No transition of their purchases was made to the Ovi store, and no compensation was given because, according to support staff, software purchases are only supported for one year.

Some gaming websites e.g. Pocket Gamer link N-Gage's failure to the overwhelming competition it faces from the Apple iPhone, while Ovi Gaming cited poor implementation and support from their parent company, Nokia.

See also
 Scalable Network Application Package
 Nokia Game
 Sony Ericsson Xperia Play

References

External links
N-Gage’s official website
Nokia’s official website
Get Out And Play, an N-Gage promoting website, owned by Nokia

Mobile software
Nokia platforms
Nokia services
Online video game services
Seventh-generation video game consoles
Mobile software distribution platforms